Father Florian (born Prince Franz-Josef of Bavaria, 21 September 1957 – 22 June 2022) was a member of the Roman Catholic Order of Saint Benedict.

Early life
Franz-Josef was born at Schloß Leutstetten near Starnberg, Bavaria. He is the eldest son of Prince Rasso of Bavaria and his wife, Archduchess Theresa of Austria, and belongs to the House of Wittelsbach.

Later life
Florian was a Benedictine monk, a member of the Roman Catholic Order of Saint Benedict. Until 1996, he lived under the name Pater Florian at the St. Ottilien Archabbey in Emming in southern Bavaria. Since 1996, he had been living at the Peramiho Abbey in Tanzania and in Kenya he became prior administrator of the Prince of Peace Benedictine Monastery – Tigoni Limuru.  He was lately working in Illeret, St. Peter the Fisherman parish, and a new Benedictine Monastery in the Diocese of Marsabit, northern part of Kenya. Pater Florian died in Kenya on 22 June 2022.

References

 Adalbert Prinz von Bayern. Die Wittelsbacher: Geschichte unserer Familie. München: Prestel Verlag, 1979.
 Pater Florian Prinz von Bayern. Weil es etwas Größeres gibt. Freiburg; Herder Verlag, 2012.
 Home page of the St. Ottilien Archabbey (in German): https://web.archive.org/web/20080417202846/http://www.erzabtei.de/html/
 Home page of the St. Benedict's Abbey in Peramiho, Tanzania: https://web.archive.org/web/20120207093627/http://www.inkamana.org/ohio/peramiho.htm

Princes of Bavaria
House of Wittelsbach
1957 births
Living people
People from Starnberg
German Benedictines
German people of Austrian descent